Muzungu Sisters is a fashion company founded in 2009 (launched in 2011) by Tatiana Casiraghi and Dana Alikhani. The word "Muzungu" is Swahili, meaning "traveler" or "wanderer."

Mission
They "commission handcrafted goods" from artisans in obscure, far-out communities who otherwise might never have been discovered. They are a "sustainable" company that stresses "fair labor practices."  The company’s mission is to “to promote artisan craftwork around the world, supporting diminishing crafts” by working with NGOs, fair-trade cooperatives and local experts. With a focus on "fine craftsmanship, natural materials and traditional techniques", the founders are inspired by travel, friends, family and street style.

The founders

Dana Alikhani
Dana Alikhani is Iranian and was born and raised in Cyprus. She holds a Bachelor’s Degree in Social Anthropology from SOAS, and a Masters Degree from Columbia University in Human Rights. She focused her attention on ethical labour practices, an interest that eventually led her to the founding of Muzungu Sisters.  

Before launching the company in 2011, Dana held positions at the United Nations High Commission for Refugees (UNHCR) and as a Middle East business risk analyst in London.

Tatiana Casiraghi
Tatiana Casiraghi, née Santo Domingo, is Brazilian on her mother's side, Colombian on her father's side, and married to Andrea Casiraghi, the eldest son of Caroline, Princess of Hanover. Casiraghi has a BFA in visual communications, with a concentration in photography, from the American University in London. She worked in fashion and publishing prior to business partnership with Alikhani.

Headquarters
Muzungu Sisters Ltd. is based in London. They have a showroom at 242 Acklam Road. The retail is done primiarily online, via their official website, MuzunguSisters.com, and mass retailers like YOOX Net-a-Porter Group. However, the company does "pop-ups" periodically around the world. The first pop-up was held in London.

References

External links
 Official website

Online clothing retailers of the United Kingdom